Spirotropis is a genus of flowering plants in the family Fabaceae. It belongs to the subfamily Faboideae.

Species
Spirotropis comprises the following species:
 Spirotropis candollei Tul.
 Spirotropis longifolia (DC.) Baill.

References

Ormosieae
Fabaceae genera
Taxa named by Edmond Tulasne